Newark Valley is a north–south trending endorheic valley in western White Pine County, Nevada. To the west, the Diamond Mountains border the valley and to the east, various minor mountains separate the Newark from Long Valley. To the north across a relatively low divide lies Huntington and Ruby valleys.

US Route 50 crosses the south end of the valley at the north end of the Pancake Range. Nevada State Route 892 runs north from US 50 along the west margin of the valley.

References 

Valleys of Nevada
Valleys of White Pine County, Nevada